The 1957–58 season in Swedish football, starting August 1957 and ending December 1958:

Honours

Official titles

Competitions

Promotions, relegations and qualifications

Promotions

League transfers

Relegations

International qualifications

Domestic results

Allsvenskan 1957–58

Allsvenskan promotion play-off 1957–58

Division 2 Norrland 1957–58

Division 2 Svealand 1957–58

Division 2 Östra Götaland 1957–58

Division 2 Västra Götaland 1957–58

National team results

Notes

References 
Print

Online

 
Seasons in Swedish football